Memoir (published in North America as All Will Be Well) is an autobiographical account of the childhood of Irish writer John McGahern. It was published in 2005, and the writer died in 2006. It recalls, amongst other things, his formative years in Leitrim, Ireland, the death of his beloved mother, Susan, and his relationship with his dark and enigmatic father. Themes from his childhood experiences run throughout his canon of fiction.

Editions 

2005 non-fiction books
Irish memoirs
Literary memoirs
Works by John McGahern
Faber and Faber books